Menthonnex-en-Bornes is a commune in the Haute-Savoie department in the Auvergne-Rhône-Alpes region in south-eastern France.

Geography

By road, the commune is about halfway between Geneva and Annecy on the plateau of Bornes. It is separated from the mountain Salève by the Les Usses river valley, which forms its western border. The southern border is defined by the stream Grand Verray.

Pronunciation
The final ex in Menthonnex is not pronounced; it should be read as Menthonné.

See also
Communes of the Haute-Savoie department

References

Communes of Haute-Savoie